Dennis O'Sullivan (born January 28, 1976) is a former American football center who played for the New York Jets and Houston Texans of the National Football League (NFL). He played college football at Tulane University.

References 

1976 births
Living people
American football centers
People from Suffern, New York
Players of American football from New York (state)
Tulane Green Wave football players
New York Jets players
Houston Texans players